The 2.5-millimeter or 122 GHz band is a portion of the EHF (microwave) radio spectrum internationally allocated to amateur radio use between 122.250 GHz and 123.000 GHz.

The band is close to a molecular resonance of oxygen at 120 GHz, which causes significant atmospheric propagation losses, similar to that found at 60 GHz.  

Due to the lack of commercial off the shelf radios, amateurs who operate on the 2.5 mm band must design and construct their own equipment, and those who do, often attempt to set communication distance records for the band.

Allocation 
The International Telecommunication Union allocates 122.250 GHz and 123.000 GHz to amateur radio on a secondary basis.  As secondary users, amateurs must protect the fixed, mobile and inter-satellite services from harmful interference, which share the band with amateurs.  In addition, 122 GHz to 123 GHz is an ISM band, and all users must accept interference caused by ISM devices.  Amateur satellite operations are not permitted, and the ITU's allocations are the same in all three ITU Regions.

List of notable frequencies 
122.250 to 122.251 GHz Narrow band modes
122.5 GHz ISM band center frequency

Distance records 
The current world distance record on the 2.5 mm band is  set by stations K6ML, KB6BA and N9JIM on February 17, 2020.  

The previous world distance record on the 2.5 mm band was  set by Austrian stations OE5VRL and OE3WOG on October 19, 2013.

The previous United States distance record was  set by stations WA1ZMS and W4WWQ on January 18, 2005.

In Australia, the 2.5 mm distance record was  set by stations VK4FB and VK4CSD on July 18, 2019.

See also 
Amateur radio frequency allocations

References

External links 
 UK Microwave Group's 122 GHz page
 First 122 GHz VUCC - Mount Greylock Expeditionary Force

Amateur radio bands